Juan José Lobato del Valle (born 30 December 1988) is a Spanish professional road racing cyclist, who currently rides for UCI ProTeam .

Career
He then went on to sign a 2-year contract with  starting 2017. In December 2017, Lobato's contract was terminated, for possession of sleeping pills during a pre-season training camp – violating the team's internal rules.

He joined  during the 2018 season, remaining until the end of 2019, before joining  for the 2020 season.

Major results

2006
 1st  Road race, National Junior Road Championships
2010
 9th Road race, UCI Under-23 Road World Championships
2011
 1st Circuito de Getxo
 7th Trofeo Mallorca
 10th Clásica de Almería
2012
 Vuelta Ciclista de Chile
1st Stages 2 & 10
 1st Stage 5 Tour of Qinghai Lake
2013
 1st Circuito de Getxo
 1st Stage 2 Vuelta a Castilla y León
 4th Clásica de Almería
 6th Vuelta a La Rioja
2014
 1st Stage 1 Vuelta a Burgos
 2nd Overall Tour de Wallonie
1st Stage 3
 2nd Clásica de Almería
 4th Gran Premio Nobili Rubinetterie
 4th Milan–San Remo
 8th Vattenfall Cyclassics
2015
 Vuelta a Andalucía
1st Stages 2 & 5
 1st Stage 2 Tour Down Under
 2nd Down Under Classic
 2nd Circuito de Getxo
 2nd Clásica de Almería
 3rd Overall Dubai Tour
 4th Gran Premio Nobili Rubinetterie
2016
 1st  Overall Vuelta a la Comunidad de Madrid
1st  Points classification
1st Stage 1
 3rd Overall Dubai Tour
1st Stage 3
 3rd Overall Circuit de la Sarthe
1st Stage 4
 4th Gran Piemonte
2017
 1st Stage 1 Tour de l'Ain
 6th Eschborn–Frankfurt – Rund um den Finanzplatz
2018
 1st Coppa Sabatini
 4th Coppa Bernocchi
 4th Gran Premio Bruno Beghelli
 5th Brussels Cycling Classic
 10th Eschborn–Frankfurt
2019
 6th Overall Tour de Korea
 10th Overall Tour de Hokkaido
1st  Points classification
2020
 7th Trofeo Playa de Palma
 9th Clásica de Almería
2021
 1st Stage 1 Volta ao Alentejo
 7th Trofeo Calvià
 10th Clàssica Comunitat Valenciana 1969
2022
 1st Stage 5 Volta ao Alentejo

Grand Tour general classification results timeline

References

External links

Juan José Lobato profile at Andalucía-Caja Granada

1988 births
Living people
Spanish male cyclists
Cyclists from Andalusia
People from Costa Noroeste de Cádiz
Sportspeople from the Province of Cádiz